Nadia Buari (born November 21, 1982) is a Ghanaian actress. She received two nominations for Best Actress in a Leading Role at the Africa Movie Academy Awards in 2009.

Early life
Buari was born in Sekondi-Takoradi, Ghana, to a Lebanese father and a Ghanaian mother. She attended Mfantsiman Girls' Secondary School and then studied performing arts at the University of Ghana, graduating with a BFA degree. Throughout her time at the University of Ghana, she was actively involved in drama and dance clubs.

Career
Buari premiered on Ghanaian national television with the TV series Games People Play in late 2005. Her first major film was Mummy's Daughter, after which, she starred in Beyonce: The President's Daughter. Her role as "Beyonce" was her major breakthrough. Her movie career began with her playing a role in the TV series Games People Play in 2005, which she got nominated for best actress. She has starred in more than 20 movies. In 2013, she came out with her own movie called The Diary of Imogene Brown.

Nollywood breakthrough and success
Buari moved from Ghanaian films to Nollywood films around the year 2008. Her breakthrough role in Nollywood was in the film Beyonce & Rihanna as Beyonce alongside Nollywood actress Omotola Jalade Ekeinde who played Rihanna. The film became very popular to both Ghanaian and Nigerian audience. Her other notable Nollywood films include Rough Rider, Beauty and the Beast, Holding Hope and  Single and Married.

She is also known for co-starring in films with Nollywood actor Jim Iyke, which has also received attention. Films include the Beyonce & Rihanna film series, Hot Romance and Behind a Smile.

In 2013, she won the Pan African Actress award at the annual Nigerian Entertainment Awards (NEA Awards) in New York City.

Other work
Buari became an ambassador at Tablet India Limited (TIL) in 2013.

Personal life 
In 2019, Buari revealed in an interview that she is married and has four children. Her siblings are Malik Buari, Ayisha Buari, Shaida Buari, Jameel Buari and Jeed Rogers. Her parents are Sidiku Buari and Hajia Buari.

Recognitions
In 2014, Buari was awarded the Special Recognition Award at Africa Magic Viewers Choice Awards.

Filmography

Beyoncé — The President Daughter (2006)
The Return of Beyoncé
Mummy’s Daughter
Darkness of Sorrow (2006)
Slave to Lust
In The Eyes of My Husband
American Boy
Wicked Intentions
Tomorrow Must Wait
Hidden Treasure
Beyonce & Rihanna
Beauty and the Beast (2008)
My Last Ambition
Love, Lies and Murder
Secret Lie
The Angle Against The Monster
Heartless
Last Hour Romance
Under My Pillow
Speechless
Desperate Bride
Innocent Sin
Guilty Threat
The Golden Lady
Satanic Kingdom
Rough Rider
Crazy Scandal
Unfaithful
The Monster In Me
Bad Egg
Garden of Eden
No More Love
My Dove
Agony of Christ (2009)
Heart of Men (2009)
Forbidden Fruit (2009)
Holding Hope (2010)
Chelsea (2010)
Checkmate (2010)
Single and Married (2012)
Heroes & Zeros (2012)
Game Plan (2015)
American Driver (2017)
African Messiah
 > Deranged

References

External links

 

1982 births
Living people
University of Ghana alumni
Ghanaian film actresses
Mfantsiman Girls' Secondary School alumni
Ghanaian people of Arab descent
Ghanaian people of Lebanese descent